Whitehall is a street (and its environs) in central London.

Whitehall may also refer to:

London, England
Palace of Whitehall, from which the street takes its name, destroyed by fire in 1698
Whitehall, Cheam, an historic building in the London Borough of Sutton
Whitehall House, 41 & 43 Whitehall
Whitehall Study, a study of stress and health in British civil servants
Trafalgar Studios or Whitehall Theatre

Houses
Whitehall, one of the Magnificent Seven Houses in Port of Spain, Trinidad and Tobago
Whitehall Mansion, Stonington, Connecticut
Flagler Museum or Whitehall, Palm Beach, Florida
Whitehall House & Gardens, Louisville, Kentucky, a historic house museum in Kentucky
Whitehall Plantation House (Monroe, Louisiana), a National Register of Historic Places listing in Ouachita Parish, Louisiana
Whitehall (Annapolis, Maryland)
Whitehall (Columbus, Mississippi)
Whitehall (Lincoln, Nebraska)
Whitehall Terrace, Durham, North Carolina
Whitehall Farm, Yellow Springs, Ohio
Whitehall Museum House, Middletown, Rhode Island
Whitehall (Narragansett, Rhode Island), Narragansett, Rhode Island
Whitehall (Aiken County, South Carolina)
Whitehall (Greenville, South Carolina)
Whitehall (Saluda, South Carolina)
Whitehall (Clarksville, Tennessee)
Whitehall (Sutherland Springs, Texas), listed on the NRHP in Wilson County, Texas

Places

Ireland
Whitehall, Dublin

United Kingdom
Whitehall, Bristol
Whitehall, Hampshire
Whitehall, Orkney (on Stronsay)

United States
Whitehall, Lee County, Arkansas, a place in Arkansas
Whitehall, Poinsett County, Arkansas 
Whitehall, Yell County, Arkansas, a place in Arkansas
Whitehall, California, in Mendocino County
Whitehall, California, former name of White Hall, California, in El Dorado County
Whitehall, Georgia
Whitehall, Indiana
Whitehall, La Salle Parish, Louisiana
Whitehall, Livingston Parish, Louisiana
Whitehall, Dorchester County, Maryland, an unincorporated community in Dorchester County
Whitehall, Michigan, a city
Whitehall Township, Michigan, in which the city is located
Whitehall, Montana
Whitehall, New Jersey
Whitehall (village), New York 
Whitehall (town), New York
Whitehall, Ohio
Whitehall, Adams County, Pennsylvania in Adams County, Pennsylvania
Whitehall, Allegheny County, Pennsylvania 
Whitehall Township, Lehigh County, Pennsylvania
Whitehall Borough, Pennsylvania, a defunct borough now part of the city of Philadelphia
Whitehall, Texas, a town in Texas connected by intersections of Texas State Highway 105
Whitehall, Virginia
Whitehall, Wisconsin

Ships
HMS Whitehall (D94), a British destroyer completed in 1924
USS Whitehall, several naval ships operated by the United States
Whitehall Rowboat, a type of rowboat named for its original place of manufacture, the end of Whitehall Street in New York City

Other uses
Whitehall Street, New York City
Staten Island Ferry Whitehall Terminal
Whitehall State Park, Massachusetts
Whitehall (novel), a 1931 novel by E. V. Timms

People with the surname
Jack Whitehall (born 1988), British comedian
Michael Whitehall (born 1940), English television producer, talent agent, television personality, and author
Raj Whitehall, protagonist of The General series by S. M. Stirling
William Whitehall (1934-2020), American politician

See also
White Hall (disambiguation)
White's Hall, the boyhood home of Johns Hopkins